Ghostkeeper is a 1981 Canadian supernatural slasher film directed by James Makichuk, and starring Riva Spier, Georgie Collins, and Murray Ord. Its plot centers on a trio of snowmobilers in the Canadian Rockies who become stranded at an abandoned hotel where the elderly female innkeeper is hiding an evil entity within the building. The film is inspired by the Windigo legend of North America.

Filmed in Banff, Alberta under a tax shelter in December 1980, the film had an unstable financial situation and the filmmakers nearly halted the production mid-way through due to depletion of its budget. The film was given a minuscule theatrical run in Canada and the United States and is consequently little-known among horror film fans, but has attained a cult following over the years.

The independent cult label Code Red Releasing later acquired the film, and released on DVD for the first time in April 2012. In August 2017, they reissued the film on Blu-ray featuring a new 2K scan of the original film elements.

Plot
Jenny, Marty, and Chrissy are spending their New Year's Eve on a snowmobiling trip in the Rocky Mountains. After talking with a storekeeper at a ski shop, the three decide to go riding before dark, but end up caught in a blizzard. Looming before them is a seemingly abandoned hotel at the top of the snow trail, isolated from tourists and miles away from the skiing area. The three enter the building to escape the increasingly harsh conditions, and find that the heat is on, but there are no lights. As night falls, they start a fire and tell stories and reminisce. Marty decides to go into the hotel kitchen where he finds an old woman lurking. She is brash and apprehensive of their presence, and they learn that she lives in the hotel with two unseen sons.

Though hesitant, the woman lodges them in rooms. Marty and Jenny argue in their bedroom, while Chrissy goes down the hallway to take a bath since the plumbing in the rooms is obsolete. While in the bathtub, Chrissy is attacked by one of the sons, Danny, and held underwater. A restless Jenny goes to check on Chrissy, but the candle-lit bathroom is empty; Jenny then runs into the old woman and they have a conversation about the hotel and her sons. Meanwhile, Danny carries Chrissy to the basement of the hotel, where he slits her throat and then stores her body in a freezer. Jenny awakens in the night and hears the old woman talking to someone downstairs.

The next morning, Marty goes outside to the snowmobiles to activate them, with no success. Suspecting that they have been tampered with, he goes outside to an old shed for tools, while Jenny stays in the kitchen with the old woman. After accepting the tea from the offering woman, Jenny inquires about Chrissy's disappearance, but the old woman is evasive. Jenny returns to a lounge in the hotel where she realizes she's been drugged, and falls unconscious. She awakens in the basement, where she finds a book on First Nations folklore and reads that a Wendigo is often "kept" by an old woman who had the power passed on to her from another. She opens the freezer and discovers a human Windigo inside, being the old woman's second son. Danny then comes down to the basement with a chainsaw and chases Jenny throughout the hotel, up into the attic. Jenny exits through a window onto a small balcony; she manages to push him over, where he is impaled on an iron fence below.

Jenny finds Marty outside, who appears to be possessed and rambling to himself while wandering into the woods. Meanwhile, the storekeeper arrives at the hotel, where he is stabbed by the old woman. Jenny re-enters the hotel, where she finds Danny's body has been dragged into the foyer. She locates a shotgun in a storage room, and is confronted by the old woman, who claims that she is Jenny's deceased mother. Jenny shoots and kills her. Strangely overtaken, she visits the Wendigo in the freezer where she says that she "will look after you now." and finds Marty's body outside with no reaction. In the end, Jenny sits in a lounge chair in front of a fireplace as the old woman's voice is heard.

Cast
Riva Spier as Jenny
Murray Ord as Marty
Sheri McFadden as Chrissy
Georgie Collins as Ghostkeeper
Les Kimber as Storekeeper
Bill Grove as Danny (credited as Billy Grove)
John MacMillan as Windigo

Production

Casting
The majority of the cast of Ghostkeeper were locally-hired actors in the Calgary area, with the exception being lead Riva Spier, who was an actress hired out of Montreal.  For the majority of the cast, Ghostkeeper was their first and final film credit; Georgie Collins was primarily a well-known stage actress in Calgary, and was cast in the role of the mysterious elderly hotel proprietor.

Murray Ord went on to become a successful film producer in later years.

Filming

Ghostkeeper was filmed on location in Lake Louise and the Banff National Park in Alberta, Canada. Filming began on November 30, 1980, and finished on December 23, 1980. The film was photographed by cinematographer John Holbrook. Producer Harry Cole commented during the shoot: "It's a producer's dream— it has one location in a controlled environment." Cole also described film as more a "suspense movie" along the lines of Psycho (1960).

Ghostkeeper was produced via a tax shelter on a budget of approximately CA$750,000–850,000. Its tax shelter funding made the production's financial situation rather unstable; James Makichuk said that he was given the option of halting the film's production when the funding began to run low, but he pursued to finish the film anyway—

According to Makichuk, prior to the depletion of the budget, his original intention was to film a much longer ending, including an extended chase sequence with Spier and the Wendigo creature on the rooftop of the Deer Lodge hotel.

Music
The film's score was composed by Paul Zaza, who also composed music for fellow Canadian slasher film productions Prom Night (1980), My Bloody Valentine (1981), and Curtains (1983). Zaza got on board due to the involvement of film editor Stan Cole. In fact, some of the musical themes featured in Ghostkeeper were also used in Prom Night.

Alternate opening
An alternate opening to the film was shot by distributors two years after the initial production. In the opening, a young man fleeing from the hotel at sunlight and running into the woods until backing up against a tree. While pinned, he is killed (presumably by Danny) and stabbed from a sharp wood stake. This opening was not featured in the 1986 VHS.

Release
Ghostkeeper was to screened out of competition at the Cannes Film Festival in May 1981. It subsequently had its North American theatrical premiere at Calgary's Tivoli Theater on March 3, 1982.

Critical response
Rosemary McCracken of the Calgary Herald commented on the film's screenplay, noting that it carries "distinct echoes of Stanley Kubrick's The Shining," adding that "despite the flaws in the script, the film has a fair bit going for it. The performances are a notch above those being offered in much of the American horror fare being served up in our theaters."

Of contemporary reviews, the horror film website The Terror Trap gave the film a positive review stating, "Not for all tastes, the methodically paced Ghostkeeper is an exercise in disciplined mood generation; its bare claustrophobia either works for the viewer or not. But for those who prefer their chills straightforward, pre-sneer and pre-sarcasm, Keeper can be a most rewarding snow trap".

J.A. Kerswell from Hysteria Lives! gave the film a negative review calling the film "flawed", and "muddled". In The Blockbuster Entertainment Guide to Movies and Videos (1999), the film was rated two-and-a-half stars out of five, deemed "an absurd thriller." Eric Cotenas of DVD Drive-In noted the film's prominent atmosphere and drew comparisons to Stephen King's The Shining as well as cinematographer John Holbrook’s "aesthetic response to the desolate location."

Home media
The film did not receive a home video release until September 1986. The film was released on VHS in September 1986 through New World Pictures' home video branch. Director James Makichuk stated in an interview that he was trying to get a DVD released through Netflix with a quality print of the film.

In April 2012, Ghostkeeper was released for the first time on DVD through Code Red Releasing. The DVD included a commentary with James Makichuck, Riva Spier and Murray Ord, an interview with director of photography John Holbrook as well as an interview with actress Georgie Collins. The film is presented in 1.78.1 anamorphic widescreen for the first time on video and has been restored from the only known existing film elements. On August 18, 2017, Code Red issued a Blu-ray edition of the film featuring a new 2K scan of the original film elements.

See also
Folklore of the United States
Wendigo

References

Sources

External links
 
 
 
Keeping Up With The Ghost Keeper - Jim Makichuk Interviewed At Rock! Shock! Pop!
Nightmare at Deer Lodge: An Interview with Jim Makichuk - October 2012
Interview with director Jim Makichuk on Ghostkeeper
MJ Simpson – Cult movie review

1981 films
1981 drama films
1981 horror films
1980s mystery films
1980s slasher films
1980s supernatural horror films
Canadian independent films
Canadian slasher films
Canadian supernatural horror films
English-language Canadian films
Films scored by Paul Zaza
Films set in Alberta
Films set in hotels
Films shot in Alberta
Holiday horror films
Films set around New Year
Wendigos in popular culture
Films based on Native American mythology
1980s English-language films
1980s Canadian films